Orlov is a village and municipality in Stará Ľubovňa District in the Prešov Region of northern Slovakia.

History
In historical records the village was first mentioned in 1349.

Geography
The municipality lies at an altitude of 494 metres and covers an area of 20.772.576 m². It has a population of about 763 people.

External links
Orlov - The Carpathian Connection
https://web.archive.org/web/20071116010355/http://www.statistics.sk/mosmis/eng/run.html 
http://www.obecorlov.sk/

Villages and municipalities in Stará Ľubovňa District
Šariš